is a 2014 Japanese supernatural horror film and the tenth installment of the Ju-on franchise. The film was directed and co-written by Masayuki Ochiai with Takashige Ichise producing and co-writing. The Beginning of the End is a reboot of the series, retelling the events of the cursed Saeki family that centers on a house in Nerima, Japan.

Plot
Continuing the trademark of the series, Beginning of the End is divided into eight segments presented in an anachronistic order, each titled after a character central to that segment. They are, in the following order: Yui (結衣), Nanami (七海), Kayako (伽椰子), Yayoi (弥生), Rina (莉奈), Aoi (葵), Naoto (直人), and Toshio (俊雄). The synopsis presents a rough chronology of the film's plot.

In 1995 Tokyo, after a report of a possible child abuse happening in the Yamaga household, authorities and the schoolteacher of the family's son, Toshio, search the household and find Toshio dead in the bedroom closet.

Nine years later, a group of high school students: Nanami, Yayoi, Aoi, and Rina, visit the former Yamaga house, now taken for sale by Aoi's older sister. Nanami is shoved to enter due to rumors of the house being haunted. While the others find drawings depicting horrific deaths upon them and laugh, Nanami hears a noise and sees black liquid. She tries to escape but Toshio grabs her. Unaware, her friends leave. Yayoi is later dragged away by Toshio in the infirmary. Nanami and Aoi find Rina having gone insane since the house visit. Rina is then also taken by Toshio in the refrigerator. Aoi's brother-in-law, Kyosuke, is concerned that Aoi visited the house. In the bathroom, Toshio kills Aoi by ripping off her jaw and leaving it for her sister to find. Nanami is terrorized by her dead friends on a train before being dragged away and killed offscreen. Meanwhile, Aoi's sister sells the house to a couple named Takeo and Kayako Saeki.

Ten years later, an elementary schoolteacher, Yui Shono, is assigned to replace Mr. Konishi as homeroom teacher. She is concerned when she finds that a student, Toshio Saeki, has been absent for a week and decides to visit the Saeki household. She meets Toshio's mother, Kayako, who acts strangely, and finds the bedroom closet sealed with tape. Yui is disturbed by Kayako's behavior and hastily leaves. She is informed the next day that Mr. Konishi has died. She has hallucinations of Toshio, and finds Kayako's diary. Her boyfriend, Naoto Miyakoshi, reads the diary, which reveals that Kayako, who could not have a child with Takeo, became pregnant when a boy in white "touched" her in a dream. He meets with the widowed Kyosuke, who inquires about the curse that claimed the lives of his wife and her sister, and finds out that Toshio Yamaga and Toshio Saeki are the same. Naoto is later killed by Kayako when Kayako snaps his neck clockwise.

Yui, having recovered, visits the Saeki household to seek vengeance and opens the closet, discovering a box of tapes that show the Saeki family's lives. One tape reveals that Kayako did indeed get pregnant not by Takeo, but by the spirit of Toshio Yamaga. Yui experiences flashbacks of Takeo murdering Kayako after he found out he was not Toshio's father. She finds Kayako's body, who crawls towards her, and is then cornered by both Kayako and Toshio. Suddenly, she wakes up at her apartment. She goes to the living room, only to find Naoto, with his head snapped, walking towards her and Toshio sitting on the kitchen table. Yui's fate is left unknown.

Cast
  Nozomi Sasaki as 
 Sho Aoyagi as 
 Reina Triendl as 
 Miho Kanazawa as 
 Haori Takahashi as 
 Yuina Kuroshima as 
 Maki Ishikawa as 
 Yuka Eta as 
 Masako Ikeda as 
 Misaki Saisho as Kayako Saeki
 Kai Kobayashi as Toshio Saeki/
 Yasuhito Hida as Takeo Saeki
 Yoshihiko Hakamada as

Production
The film was first announced at a press conference held at Akagi Shrine in Tokyo in February 2014, following a spirit cleansing ceremony at the shrine. Filming began soon thereafter on March 4. Beginning of the End was released on June 28 in Japan. The film was screened in the west as part of Fantasia Festival at the same time.

Reception
The film has grossed ¥226 million (US$1.90 million) at the Japanese box office.

Sequel

A sequel, Ju-On: The Final Curse, was promoted as the final installment in the Ju-on franchise. The film is again helmed by Masayuki Ochiai and stars Airi Taira as Mai Shono, the older sister of The Beginning of the End protagonist, Yui, who disappeared while visiting her pupil, Toshio Saeki. Kai Kobayashi and Misaki Saisho additionally return as Toshio and Kayako Saeki, respectively. The Final Curse was released on June 20, 2015.

References

External links 
  
 
 

Japanese horror films
Japanese ghost films
2014 horror films
2014 films
Reboot films
Ju-On films
Films about curses
Films set in 1995
Films set in 2004
Films set in 2014
Films directed by Masayuki Ochiai
2010s Japanese films
2010s Japanese-language films